Christopher Jerry "Kit" Symons (born 8 March 1971) is a professional association football manager and former Welsh international footballer. As a professional player, he had lengthy spells at Portsmouth, Manchester City and Fulham as well as earning 36 caps for the Wales national football team. He was most recently the assistant manager of Wales national football team but left the post on 4 January, 2023 in the wake of the team's elimination at the first round in the 2022 World Cup.

Club playing career
Symons was born in Basingstoke, Hampshire. He made more than 100 League appearances for each of his first three clubs – Portsmouth, Manchester City and Fulham. He played for Fulham until December 2001, when he was signed by Crystal Palace for £400,000, the club at which he finished his playing career after 60 senior appearances.

International career
Symons qualified to play for Wales because his father was from Cardiff.
He won 36 caps for Wales, scoring twice. His first appearance was against the Republic of Ireland on 19 February 1992 and his last appearance was on 6 October 2001 against Belarus.

Coaching and management
He became caretaker manager at Palace, and following the subsequent appointment of Iain Dowie he combined the roles of player and assistant manager, as the club gained promotion to the Premier League.

After Peter Taylor was dismissed as Palace manager on 8 October 2007, Symons was confirmed as caretaker manager before the appointment of Neil Warnock three days later. Palace did not play during this time. Following Warnock's appointment, Symons stepped down from his position of assistant manager and left the club on 15 October 2007.

Symons joined Colchester United on 16 January 2008 following Micky Adams' resignation as assistant manager the previous week. He was appointed as Colchester's caretaker manager on 22 September 2008 after the departure of Geraint Williams. He led the club to two wins in five games, in the process becoming the bookie's favourite to get the job full-time. However, he left the club after Paul Lambert took over as manager on 9 October 2008.

Symons was subsequently employed by Fulham as Senior Scout and Academy Coach.

In January 2012 Symons was appointed to the Wales national team coaching staff under team manager Chris Coleman.

On 18 September 2014, Symons was confirmed as caretaker manager of Fulham following the departure of Felix Magath. On 29 October 2014, after a string of good results (5 wins in 9 games), Symons was announced as the full-time manager of Fulham. Symons stated that it was "no secret this is a club that is very close to my heart and this is a job I've always really wanted to do." Khan also stated that Symons' "passion for everything that Fulham represents came through loud and clear."

In July 2015, Symons resigned his position with the Wales national team to concentrate on his role with Fulham.

Symons was dismissed by Fulham on 8 November 2015, the day after a 5–2 defeat by Birmingham City at Craven Cottage.

Symons rejoined Wales as coach in August 2016. On 17 November 2017, Symons left his coaching role with Wales following the resignation of Chris Coleman. On 19 November 2017, Symons was announced as assistant manager at Sunderland following Coleman's appointment as manager. Both were released from their contracts after Sunderland's relegation to League One was confirmed. In June 2018, after Coleman's appointment as manager of Hebei China Fortune, Symons again joined him as assistant.

Managerial statistics

References

External links

1971 births
Living people
Sportspeople from Basingstoke
Footballers from Hampshire
English footballers
Welsh footballers
Association football defenders
Portsmouth F.C. players
Manchester City F.C. players
Fulham F.C. players
Crystal Palace F.C. players
Premier League players
English Football League players
Wales international footballers
English football managers
Welsh football managers
Crystal Palace F.C. managers
Colchester United F.C. managers
Fulham F.C. managers
English Football League managers
Crystal Palace F.C. non-playing staff
Colchester United F.C. non-playing staff
Fulham F.C. non-playing staff
Sunderland A.F.C. non-playing staff
Association football coaches
Association football scouts